Jon Butcher (born May 5, 1955) is an American rock, blues songwriter, guitarist and freelance multimedia producer.

Early life
Jon A. Toombs, is the elder son of Joan Butts and John A Toombs Sr. In 1967, Jon's stepfather William Butcher moved the family from Philadelphia, Pennsylvania, to Clear Air Force Base, Clear, Alaska. In 1969 the family moved back to Pennsylvania. Jon and his younger brother Brian completed secondary education at Conestoga High School. Jon studied Broadcast Journalism at Grahm Junior College in Boston, Massachusetts.

Influences
Many people have made comparisons between Jon Butcher and Jimi Hendrix particularly in the early stages of Jon's career. These comparisons were fueled by Butcher's onstage appearance and mannerisms, patterned after Hendrix, and his choice for the band name Axis, a reference to Hendrix album Axis: Bold as Love. Butcher's stated influences are Richie Havens, John Lennon, Phil Lynott, Bob Dylan, and Taj Mahal, and he maintains that the Hendrix comparisons are superficial, saying "... outside of the surface aspect, I don’t think there was much about me that was Jimi Hendrix-like, if you disregard the fact that I’m black and play a Stratocaster."

Johanna Wild
During the middle to late 1970s, Jon Butcher toured the Northeast U.S. with the Boston-based band Johanna Wild. Other band members were Jeff Linscott (guitar), Derek Blevins (drums) and  Troy Douglas Sutler III (bass). Their song, "Suzanne" was played on local radio stations such as WBCN.

Jon Butcher Axis
Jon Butcher appeared on MTV and radio station WBCN in Boston, MA. He formed Jon Butcher Axis with Sandy Higgins (guitar), Chris Martin (bass) and former Johanna Wild drummer Derek Blevins and the band opened for Kiss in Fort Worth, TX) in October 1979.
Soon after, Higgins left to be the front man for Balloon, while Charlie Farren fronted the Mk3 lineup of The Joe Perry Project. Later Axis became a power trio and performed throughout New England.

American Tour opening for The J. Geils Band
Jon Butcher Axis was toured with J. Geils Band on their 1982 Freeze Frame American tour. Jon Butcher Axis secured an international record deal with PolyGram Records which led to the albums The Jon Butcher Axis and Stare at the Sun, both produced by Pat Moran, who produced for Robert Plant, Edie Brickell and Lou Gramm.

1983
1983 saw the release of their first and self-titled album, The Jon Butcher Axis, featuring "Life Takes A Life". Other notable tracks included "Ocean in Motion" and "Walk Like This". This album reached No. 91 in the Billboard Pop Albums chart and Jon Butcher Axis' video "Life Takes a Life" became one of the first videos by a black artist to receive airtime on MTV. At that time, the only two black artists enjoying MTV coverage were The Jon Butcher Axis and Michael Jackson. The band's second album, Stare at the Sun (1984), reached No. 160 on the Billboard album chart. The result of these two albums' successes afforded further growing popularity for the band, which added the opportunity to tour with Rush ('Signals' tour '83), Def Leppard ('Pyromania' tour '83) and Scorpions ('Hurricane' tour '84), among others.

1985–1986
In 1985, Jon Butcher Axis signed with Capitol Records and released Along the Axis. The track, "The Ritual", earned multiple writers in the band a Grammy Nomination for Best Rock Instrumental Performance. On that same album, singles and videos were released for the songs "The Sounds of Your Voice" and "Stop". "The Sounds of Your Voice" (written by band member Thom Gimbel) was the only single to hit the Billboard charts Hot 100 reaching No. 94. Quotes Jon, "The Capitol Records experience was a positive one. Jon Butcher Axis frequently toured major venues across the US during this period, opening for INXS".

1987–1989
The following releases, Wishes (1987) and Pictures from the Front (1989) were simply recorded under the Jon Butcher name. Wishes was Butcher's most successful album. Rumored to have achieved Gold Award status, there is no evidence of this on the RIAA database. MTV videos released from both of these records included "Holy War", "Goodbye Saving Grace" and "Wishes".

Barefoot Servants

In 1991, Jon Butcher Axis ended its run. Jon Butcher himself spent most of the '90s on various multimedia projects. In 1994, he formed Barefoot Servants which released their self-titled album on Epic Records. The band included Leland Sklar (bass), Ben Schultz (guitar) and Ray Brinker (drums). Their second record, Barefoot Servants 2 was released by Atom Records in August 2005. Drummer Ray Brinker was replaced by Londoner Neal Wilkinson.

Solo endeavors
In the mid 1990s, Butcher released two solo blues albums, Positively the Blues and Electric Factory, a title loosely derived from Jimi Hendrix's Electric Ladyland. In 1998, Razor & Tie released The Best of Jon Butcher – Dreamers Would Ride. In November 2000, Butcher released a CD exclusively through his web site A Long Way Home. A Stiff Little Breeze was released on Atom Records in 2001 and was Jon's first solo project with the independent label. This CD resurrected the Jon Butcher Axis name, and again the Hendrix reference. 2002 brought an additional Jon Butcher Axis release, An Ocean in Motion – Live in Boston 1984. Jon joined the Chris Pierce band in 2008 as guitarist and released a live CD Live at the Hotel Cafe. Jon is currently working on Chris' third studio release.

Video
Butcher's first DVD video release came in 2004. Live at the Casbah was filmed in December 1984 at The Casbah concert venue in Manchester, New Hampshire. It contains several never-released songs, and additional music from his first three Jon Butcher Axis releases.

Multimedia projects
In addition to touring all over the United States and other countries to support various incarnations of both Jon Butcher Axis and Barefoot Servants, Butcher created his own production company and state of the art recording studio "Electric Factory" located in the San Fernando Hills of California. In addition to providing music production services for recording artists, Butcher through his company "Electric Factory Music" spends a great amount of his time scoring music for television, film and computer gaming. Recent projects include music for the HBO series Deadwood and A&E's The Life and Times of Wild Bill Cody, The Hughleys (UPN), The Unit (CBS), Ugly Betty (ABC), Star Trek: The Next Generation (UPN), My Name Is Earl NBC, and Hendrix: The Movie (Wood Harris).

Discography

Albums

Singles

References

External links 

American rock singers
American rock guitarists
American male guitarists
African-American guitarists
Musical groups from Massachusetts
1955 births
Living people
20th-century American guitarists
20th-century American male musicians
20th-century African-American musicians
21st-century African-American people